Anteaeolidiella saldanhensis, is a species of sea slug, an aeolid nudibranch. It is a shell-less marine gastropod mollusc in the family Aeolidiidae.

Distribution
This species is confined to the South African coast from Saldanha Bay to southern KwaZulu Natal. It is found from the intertidal zone to a depth of at least 10 m.

Description
Anteaeolidiella saldanhensis can grow as large as 35 mm in total length. It is a slender-bodied nudibranch with orange markings on its notum. Its rhinophores and oral tentacles are white-tipped. Its cerata are short and fat, and are grey or pink with pale tips.

Ecology
This nudibranch feeds on the striped anemone Anthothoe chilensis. Its egg mass is a simple spiral consisting of three complete whorls.

References

Aeolidiidae
Molluscs of the Atlantic Ocean
Molluscs of the Indian Ocean
Endemic fauna of South Africa
Gastropods described in 1927